White Fire (also known as Vivre Pour Survivre and Le Diamant) is a 1984 French-American-Italian-Turkish thriller film by Jean-Marie Pallardy. It stars Belinda Mayne, Robert Ginty, Fred Williamson, Gordon Mitchell and Jess Hahn. The title song of the film is White Fire, sung by rock group Limelight.

Plot
A brother (Ginty) and sister (Mayne), employees at a diamond mineshaft company, stumble upon the discovery of a legendary diamond, the "White Fire", and a band of criminals set out to take it from them.

Critical reception
In 2015, the film was featured on an episode of Red Letter Media's Best of the Worst, together with Future War and The Jar.  The hosts criticized what they saw as frequent incestuous overtones present in the film, referring to it as "poorly disguised fetish porn".

References

External links
 
 
 
 
 Nanarland.com, French-language reviews of the film with images, sound files, video files and music
 Video Junkie review

1984 films
1984 action thriller films
American action thriller films
French action thriller films
English-language French films
English-language Turkish films
Turkish action thriller films
Treasure hunt films
Films set in Turkey
Films about siblings
1980s American films
1980s French films